The Churchill Arms is a public house at 119 Kensington Church Street on the corner with Campden Street, Notting Hill, London. There has been a pub on the site since at least the late nineteenth century. Previously known as the "Church-on-the-Hill", the pub received its current name after the Second World War. It is known for its exuberant floral displays, and extravagant Christmas displays in the winter, and has been described as London's most colourful pub.

The Churchill Arms is managed by Fuller's and has a Winston Churchill interior theme. The Churchill Arms claims to have been the first London pub with a Thai restaurant, having served such food since the early 1990s or earlier. The Thai restaurant is decorated with live flowers and plants.

The pub is decorated with all types of things associated with Winston Churchill, and falsely claims that Churchill made wartime broadcasts from the venue. Churchill's grandparents, the 7th Duke of Marlborough and Lady Frances Anne Emily Vane, were patrons of the pub in the 19th century.

References

External links

Pubs in the Royal Borough of Kensington and Chelsea
Notting Hill
Fuller's pubs